Piasčatkais a village in Kamenets District of Brest region. It is a part of Rosnyansky Rural Council. The republican road P16 (Tyukhnychi-Vysokaye-Pishchatka) passes through the village, which borders Poland. In May 2006, by decree of the President of Belarus, Alexander Lukashenko, a road border crossing № 10 (Pishchatka-Polovtsi) was established in the village

History
Founded in the thirteenth century. as one of the settlements of the Polovtsians of Khan Tegak, who were resettled by the Russian king Danylo Halytsky to protect his state from the attacks of the Yatvyags and Lithuanians. The former founders are evidenced by the tract Bonyak, located near the village and named after the prominent Polovtsian khan.

It was first mentioned in 1566 in a revision of the Brest Eldership.

In the 18th century the village was part of the possessions of the Radziwill princes (in 1740 the peasants complained to Anna Radziwill about the oppression and abuse of soldiers who were on duty in the village). In 1792 it passed to the estates of Peter Ozharovsky.Алексеюк М. И. Палавецкія паселішчы на Беларусі… С. 33—35 1795: after the third partition of the Commonwealth, the settlement became part of the Russian Empire.
Ser. In the 19th century the village was part of the Polovtsi estate of Count Starzhynsky. There were 267 inspected souls in the village.
In the second half of the 19th century: a village in the Polovtsian Volost of the Brestsky Uyezd of the Grodno Governorate of the Russian Empire. In Peschatka there was a parish board. There was the Polovtsian Folk School, where Makar Ignatovsky, the father of the Belarusian public and political figure, historian, and the first president of the Academy of Sciences of Belarus Vsevolod Ignatovsky, worked as a teacher for a short time.
In 1921 as a result of the Polish–Soviet War under the Riga Peace Treaty as part of Poland, the village was included in the Polovtsian gmina of the Brest district of the Polesie Voivodeship. During the interwar period, the settlement had the official name Peschatka Polovetskaya. In 1928 the Polovtsian gmina was abolished and Peschatka became a part of Verkhovichi gmina.
In September 1939 in accordance with the Molotov-Ribbentrop Pact, the Soviet Union invaded Poland and annexed lands in its eastern part to the Belarusian SSR, and so the village became part of the Brest Region of the BSSR.
1940 the village became part of the Galyansky Rural Council of the Klyashchelsky district of the Brest Region.
During World War II, 10 villagers were killed. In 1945–1948 the settlement was part of Poland. The village returned to the Belarusian SSR as a result of modification of the Soviet-Polish state border.
Since 1954 the village is a part of Rasnyansky Rural Council (of which Rasna is the administrative center). Since 1962 it is part of the Kamenets District.

References

Villages in Belarus
Brestsky Uyezd
Polesie Voivodeship
Populated places in Brest Region
Brest Litovsk Voivodeship
Belarus–Poland border crossings